Liza Gashi (born 30 September 1990) is a politician from Kosovo. She currently serves as Kosovo's Deputy Minister of Foreign Affairs and Diaspora. She has experience as an executive leader, innovator, and entrepreneur leading initiatives in policy, research, and engagement of multi-stakeholders in governance, development, migration, and diplomacy. Formerly she established and led Germin, KosovoDiaspora.org and UWC Kosova. Her interests include involving diaspora in improving the state of affairs in their home countries through investing, exchange of knowledge and participating in policy-making.

Early life and education 

Liza was born in Gjilan to an Albanian family. She graduated high school from UWC Costa Rica, while majoring college from Wartburg College in International Relations, Spanish, and Political Sciences. She participated in semester abroad studies at National University of Cordoba in 2012, taking classes in Spanish literature, Latin American history and Politics. She was a recipient USAID Kosovo's TLP scholarship, and completed graduate studies at Arizona State University, attaining an MA in Public Administration.

Career 

In 2008, she established and led the national committee of UWC Kosova, an education movement that helped place talented and youth leaders of Kosovo into world leading education institutions that are part of the United World Colleges network. In 2011, together with other members of the Albanian diaspora in the United States, she founded and served as executive director of GERMIN, a regional nonprofit organization specializing in engaging diaspora communities to advance the development and democratization of their home countries in Western Balkans. She also established KosovoDiaspora.org, a crowdsourcing digital engagement and diplomacy platform that promoted Kosovo's statehood internationally. She has policy and research experience in international development, innovation, public diplomacy, migration and diaspora matters engaging multiple stakeholders. She also led many associations, organizations and project on diaspora engagement. She is fluent in English, Albanian and Spanish. She is a Junior Fellow of European Stability Initiative. In 2022, she was named one of the European Young Leaders by Friends of Europe.

Political career 

In April 2020, she was appointed as an incumbent Deputy Minister of Foreign Affairs and Diaspora by the Prime Minister of Kosova as a member of civil society with no political affiliations, because of her contributions to advancing the cause of diaspora within the Kosova discourse. In June 2021, she was reappointed as Deputy Minister for Foreign Affairs and Diaspora, for the second term of the Kurti government.

References

Living people
1990 births
Kosovo Albanians
Kosovan women in politics
21st-century women politicians